Callionymus keeleyi, Keeley's dragonet, is a species of dragonet native to the western Pacific Ocean where it is known to occur near the Philippines and Papua New Guinea. The specific name honours Frank James Keeley (1868-1949) of the department of mineralogy, Academy of Natural Sciences, Philadelphia.

References 

K
Fish described in 1941